A lisp is a type of speech impediment.

Lisp may also refer to:

 Lisp (programming language), a family of computer programming languages
 Rhotacism (speech impediment), 'lisp' on the letter R 
 Locator/Identifier Separation Protocol, a "map-and-encapsulate" Internet protocol
 Lisp Machines, a company that built Lisp machines out of MIT
 Lisp (band), an English trip hop band
 Lisp (group), the Japanese girl group
 Light Industry and Science Park, the industrial parks